Melilla Airport  is an airport located in Melilla, an exclave of Spain in Africa. Between 1931 and 1967 Melilla was served by the Tauima Aerodrome (now the Nador International Airport), even when Morocco had gained its independence in 1956. This Spanish controlled airport did not open until 1969. It has the capacity to move up to 500,000 passengers and the annual average number of passengers is around 400,000.

These are the following declared distances for 1.428 m runway by its threshold 15 and 33:

TORA= Takeoff run available

ASDA= Available stop distance acceleration

TODA= Takeoff distance available

LDA = Landing Distance Available

The airport changes its category to category 3C on 23 February 2023 after the announcement by Aena that it allows the operation of jet aircraft such as the CRJ-200, Embraer 170, Embraer 195-E2, Bae 146, Airbus A220, Airbus A318, Airbus A319, Airbus A320, Airbus A320neo and Boeing 737, all of them penalized in payload (passenger and luggage) and distance from which they would arrive. It is necessary to extend the runway by 270 m., towards the south and another 350 m., useful to the north so that these jet planes can operate without penalty.

The geopolitical situation of the city means that the approach of the aircraft has to be done 'in a curved way', so as not to invade Moroccan airspace and hence the difficulty in installing the ILS (Instrument Landing System) guidance system in straight line that works in most airports in the world. The current radio aids (VOR/DME and NDB) are on Melilla soil, but they do not prevent the city from being cut off on days with low clouds at 700/800 feet. With an offset locator or RNAV (satellite) Approach System, airport operations with adverse weather conditions would be allowed.

Melilla airport, despite its low traffic, is located next to the Moroccan border and, since there is no agreement with Morocco, planes must perform difficult maneuvers during takeoffs and landings to avoid entering airspace from Morocco. Even so, there is no cause for concern as so far there have been no problems related to that.

Opening hours 
The hours of air operations are between 8:00 and 18:30 in winter and between 8:00 and 20:00 in summer.

History

20th century 

In the 1920s, several military aerodromes were built in area for the Air Arm of the Spanish Army:

 Ramel – now in Morocco
 Arcila – now in Morocco
 Zeluan – now in Morocco

Following the conflict between Spain and Morocco, a new military airfield was built near Cabrerizas Altas. This airport had a simple  landing area. As tension settled and Spain was able to re-establish land around Melilla, this airport was relocated again further south of city.

The new airport, Tauima Aerodrome, was opened for civilian flights 1931 and used also by the military. The El Atalayón hydroplane air station (now site of oyster farm) in the Mar Chica was operational in the 1930s to provide additional air travel options using Dornier Do J seaplanes. In 1956 the end of the Spanish protectorate over northern Morocco placed the airport outside of control from Spain, although some investment from Spain was done in the aerodrome until 1958. Limited access to the airport was given to Melilla by secured bus until 1967. The Tauima aerodrome later became Nador International Airport.

In 1969, the current airport was opened within Melilla's borders and was strictly a civilian facility. Spantax began operating on it, with a De Havilland Canada DHC-6 Twin Otter, and later, with a De Havilland Canada DHC-7.

In 1980, Spantax was replaced by Aviaco, a subsidiary of Iberia at the time, which would use a Fokker F27.

In 1992, Binter Mediterráneo would enter, also a subsidiary of Iberia, which operated with CN-235, and which later replaced Aviaco. It linked the city of Melilla with: Malaga, Almería, Valencia and, in its last year, with Madrid.

In 1995, PauknAir entered service, which operated with BAe 146, and which broke Iberia's monopoly on operations from Melilla. It managed to connect the city with 7 national airports: Malaga, Madrid, Almería, Barcelona, Palma de Mallorca and it was the first time that it connected the city of Melilla with Santiago de Compostela and Santander. This airline would cease its operations in 1998.

21st century 

Definitively, in 2001, Air Nostrum acquired Binter Mediterráneo, thus keeping the monopoly of the routes.

In February 2005, the runway expansion works were completed, thus going from 1,344 meters to 1,428 meters.

At the beginning of 2009, Air Europa carried out tests with the Embraer 195 in the LGW simulator to present them to Civil Aviation to obtain the corresponding permits, made maximum landing weight approaches, on both runways, in all types of weather conditions, with engine failure, etc. They also tested takeoffs with different flap settings and weights, and aborted takeoffs. It was determined that the plane landed perfectly at maximum landing weight, and to take off, tables were obtained from the technical office with the maximum permissible weights for each destination. In cases like Madrid-Melilla, the number of passengers had to be limited to 110. In the Melilla-Madrid, Malaga-Melilla and Melilla-Malaga; there was no limitation. The company, finally, could not operate in Melilla because the classification of the airport, category 2C, did not allow the operation of the Embraer 195, category 3C.

At the beginning of 2011, Airmel announced that it was going to start operations from Melilla with a ATR 42-300, but it never started operations due to the airline's lack of commitment to continue with the incipient airline.

On 21 November 2011 Helitt Líneas Aéreas began operations with the inaugural route Malaga-Melilla; a week later the line Melilla-Barcelona began to operate and on 2 December, the route Melilla-Madrid, all with daily flights; that once again broke with the monopoly of Air Nostrum in operations from and with Melilla. On 25 January 2013, it temporarily stopped offering commercial flights.

That same year Ryjet began operations with Malaga-Melilla, ceased operations in 2012.

At the beginning of 2013, there were rumors that Air Europa wanted to operate from Melilla, this time with one of its ATR 72-500, rumors that did not materialize.

On 16 April 2013 Melilla Airlines began operations with the inaugural route Malaga-Melilla, making regional flights with Malaga, months later with Badajoz Airport, although the connections with Badajoz did not give results, the occupation of the route to the Costa del Sol was good. A year and a half later, it ceased operations.

On 21 July 2014 Air Europa confirmed the previous rumors, took a step forward and decided to start operations with the inaugural route Malaga-Melilla with a first flight of around 90% occupancy.

At the end of the year 2016, Iberia announced the cancellation of the routes with Almería and Granada, a fact materialized at the beginning of January 2017, as there was a notable adjustment of its national routes in general and its structure as an airline.

Throughout the year 2018, the procedures for, under pressure from the Government of the Autonomous City itself and its citizens, given the widespread frustration and discomfort with the cancellation of the lines with Granada and Almería, are initiated, elaborated and formalized. after more than twenty years with daily and weekly flights, make the lines with Almería, Granada and Seville a Public Service Obligation (OSP). This data means the resumption of services with Granada and Almería, and the new service with Seville, all of which are scheduled for the end of 2018 and the beginning of 2019.

On 30 November 2018 Hélity began operations with the inaugural route Ceuta-Melilla with a first flight of an AgustaWestland AW139.In January 2020 suspends the line with Melilla. The reason is that Melilla reported that helicopter operations at Melilla airport could only be carried out from sunrise to sunset.

Just one year later, on 30 November 2019 Aena announced the change of category from 2C to 3C in March 2021. Then there was talk of the second semester of 2022. Then the exact date was given: 30 November 2022 and now the Government delegate postpones it within a maximum period of two months, which would place a new limit in March of this year. The airport changes to category 3C on 23 February 2023.

In January 2022, Air Europa suspends the line with Melilla, the reason is that it will use its ATR 72 in the Canary Islands. The company has shown its interest in continuing to connect the city with the peninsula if the airport's classification changes or if the runway is expanded and larger aircraft such as the Embraer 195 of its fleet can land.

Melilla Airport closed 2022 as the busiest year in its history, 447,450 travelers, bordering on its capacity limit of 500,000 passengers/year.

At the beginning of 2023, the Romanian airline AirConnect proposed a connectivity plan for Melilla with Malaga, Madrid and other European cities such as Porto , Lisboa and Faro.

The airlines serving the airport are regional carriers connecting to Spain to the north. The airport is also a general aviation airfield and handles private small aircraft. There are no flights directed to airports in Morocco. In the past Melilla was also served by Spantax from 1969 to 1981, Aviaco from 1981 to 1992 and Binter Mediterraneo from 1992 to 2001.

Infrastructures

Terminal 
The terminal has a total of 6 check-in counters, 3 boarding gates and 2 baggage reclaim carousels. It also has a Support Office for Passengers, Users and Clients / It is in charge of processing the suggestions of the passengers on the services and facilities of the airport. It also has claim forms from Aena Aeropuertos; Security control, passport control and a Melilla Turismo Stand in the arrivals area

Services 
Lost luggage:
 Air Nostrum | Telephone: 901 111 342

Services for families:
 Nursery room

Security forces:
 Cuerpo Nacional de Policía
 Guardia Civil

Airport information:
 Questions and suggestions

Car rental:
 OK Rent a Car | Telephone: 902 360 636

Vending machines:

Shops and restaurants:
 Airport cafeteria
 Modi's Coffee
 Airport store

Assistance service Without Barriers:
 Meeting points associated with the assistance service for people with reduced mobility or disabilities.

Airport Wi-Fi connection:
 The airport terminal is equipped with a free Wi-Fi network (for the first 15 minutes), and there is a premium payment option to extend that time at the convenience of the user.

Auxiliary facilities 
 Parking:
 P1 – General: 311 places.

Airfield 
 Control tower
 Runway 15/33: 1428 m
 Platform: 6 parking spaces.
 Helicopter Platform: 1 parking space
 Fire station

Aircraft

Aircraft used by each airline 
 Air Nostrum: ATR 72-600

Airlines and destinations

News in Destinations, Operators and Special Operations 

Last update: 3 December 2023

The following airlines operate regular scheduled and charter flights at Melilla Airport:

Most Important National Destinations (2022)

Historical airlines and destinations 
Throughout their history, the following airlines have also operated commercial flights to the airport from different points in Spain:

Statistics

Number of passengers, operations and cargo since the year 2000:

Incidents and accidents 

 On 25 September 1998, PauknAir Flight 4101, a BAe 146, crashed into a hill on approach to Melilla killing all 38 occupants.
On 17 January 2003, an Air Nostrum Fokker 50, operating for Iberia, overran the runway and broke apart. Nine people were injured but there were no fatalities.

See also
 Sania Ramel Airport

References

External links
Official site at Aena.es 

Airports in Spain

Airports established in 1969
Transport in Melilla
Buildings and structures in Melilla